Heubusch is a surname. Notable people with the surname include:

John Heubusch (born 1958), American business executive and author
Kurt Heubusch (1941–2006), Austrian sprint canoer